Silphedosuchus is an extinct genus of therocephalian therapsids from the Early Triassic of Russia. It is a member of the family Ericiolacertidae, along with the genus Ericiolacerta from South Africa and Antarctica. The type species Silphedosuchus orenburgensis was described in 1977 on the basis of a single holotype skull from Orenburg Oblast.

Silphedosuchus was found in the Rassypnaya locality of Orenburg Oblast, dating back to the Olenekian stage of the Early Triassic. It was found in a fine-grained sandstone that contains few other vertebrates. This layer was deposited in a large floodplain that covered much of European Russia during the Early Triassic. At the Rassypnaya locality, a lens of coarser sand, presumably deposited by an ancient river, cuts through the finer-grained sandstone. This deposit contains many tetrapods such as temnospondyls and archosauromorphs, but the fossils are part of a different faunal assemblage.

Silphedosuchus lacks the large canine teeth present in most other therocephalians, and has rounded crushing teeth at the back of the jaws with several cusps. Silphedosuchus has large orbits or eye sockets with raised edges. The eye socket is not entirely closed because the postorbital process, which forms the posterior margin of the orbit, does not reach the jugal bone below, which forms the bottom margin of the orbit. Characters that distinguish Silphedosuchus from Ericiolacerta include a narrow contact between the palatine and vomer bones on the roof of the mouth, a contact between the vomer and the maxilla that is positioned farther forward, and very wide buccal or cheek teeth.

References

Extinct animals of Russia
Baurioids
Therocephalia genera
Triassic synapsids
Fossil taxa described in 1977
Taxa named by Leonid Petrovich Tatarinov